The American Committee for the Liberation of the Peoples of Russia (ACLPR, AMCOMLIB), also known as the American Committee for Liberation from Bolshevism, was an American anti-communist organization founded in 1950 which worked for the abolition of the Soviet government. It was a part of CIA project QKACTIVE.

The first chairman of AMCOMLIB was Eugene Lyons.

Mikola Abramchyk was the representative of a coordinating committee of non-Russian organizations representing six
nationalities (Ukrainians, Georgians, Azeris, North Caucasians, Armenians, and Belarusians), which was founded in Europe to represent non-Russian groups willing to associate themselves with AMCOMLIB.

ALCPR founded in 1953 the anti-communist broadcaster Radio Liberation, later known as Radio Liberty. It was based in Lampertheim in Hesse, Germany, and broadcast Russian-language propaganda programmes into Russia. The broadcaster received funding from the U.S. Congress. Soviet authorities attempted to jam their broadcasts. In 1973–1976, Radio Liberty was merged with Radio Free Europe, based in the English Garden in Munich. In 1995 the station Radio Free Europe/Radio Liberty (RFE/RL) moved to Wenceslas Square in Prague.

It published its own quarterly Problems of the Peoples of the USSR (Munich; 1958–1966).

See also
 Committee for the Liberation of the Peoples of Russia, a committee of Russian anticommunists organized in Germany during World War II
 Anti-Bolshevik Bloc of Nations

References 

Anti-communist organizations in the United States
Soviet Union–United States relations
Central Intelligence Agency front organizations
Politics of the Soviet Union
Azerbaijan Soviet Socialist Republic
Byelorussian Soviet Socialist Republic
20th century in Georgia (country)
Political history of Ukraine
Armenian Soviet Socialist Republic